Sylvie Biancheri is the General Director of the Grimaldi Forum in Monaco. She has organized several exhibitions, including The Gold of the Pharaons.

References

Living people
Year of birth missing (living people)
Place of birth missing (living people)
Monegasque women in business
Knights of the Order of Cultural Merit (Monaco)